Bamra is a genus of moths of the family Noctuidae.

Species
Bamra albicola (Walker, 1858)
Bamra cazeti (Mabille, 1893)
Bamra delicata Hampson, 1922
Bamra exclusa (Leech, 1889)
Bamra glaucopasta (Bethune-Baker, 1911)
Bamra jucunda Griveaud & Viette, 1961
Bamra lepida (Moore, 1867)
Bamra marmorifera (Walker, 1858)
Bamra mundata (Walker, 1858)

References
Natural History Museum Lepidoptera genus database

Calpinae